Lee Seung Hee (born 1963 in Cheongju, South Korea; Hangul:이승희; Chinese: 李承熙) is a South Korean ceramic artist. He is known for his interpretation of Korean and Chinese ceramic objects into two-dimensional works of art. Lee Seung Hee's work is mainly exhibited in South Korea and China.

Education 
Lee Seung Hee graduated from the Handicraft Department of Cheongju University, South Korea.

References 
 YonHap News  
, review of Lee's show, 14 July to 14 August 2011, at Tongui Art Side Gallery in Seoul

External links 
 YoungSamsung Dalhangahri, Hyundai Department Store, advertisement
 Nate 
 Artside 
ArtXun 
 ArtHub 
 ArtnMap 
 NeoLook 
 KForce 
 Public Art 

Living people
1963 births